The Grampian 26 is a Canadian sailboat, that was designed by Alex McGruer and first built in 1967.

The Grampian 26 design was developed into the Discovery 7.9 in 1975 and which was built in small numbers.

Production
The boat was built by Grampian Marine in Oakville, Ontario, Canada between 1967 and 1977. The company completed 980 examples, making it one of the most successful Canadian designs in its size range.

Design

The Grampian 26 is a small recreational keelboat, built predominantly of fiberglass, with wood trim. It has a masthead sloop rig, a raked stem, a vertical transom, an internally-mounted spade-type rudder and a fixed fin keel or centreboard.

The boat was optionally factory-equipped with a Palmer gasoline engine or can be equipped with a small outboard motor for docking and maneuvering.

Operational history
In the 1970s a Grampian 26 was sailed down the St Lawrence River, to the Atlantic Ocean, down the east coast of North America, through the Panama Canal and north to Seattle on the US west coast.

Owners Dick and Theda Morris sailed their Grampian 26 from New York to Europe and cruised it there for two years. They then returned across the Atlantic to Key West, Florida via the Caribbean.

In a review Michael McGoldrick wrote, "The prize for the boat with the best price/size ratio on the used market has to go to the Grampian 26... What makes the Grampian such a great deal is its size - it is a BIG twenty-six footer. It has a large cockpit, standing headroom throughout the length of the cabin, and one of the bigger v-berths that can be found on any size production sailboat. And if all this isn't enough, the Grampian 26 is a surprisingly fast boat...The Grampian's main cabin has a dinette arrangement on the port side and a galley along the starboard side, so it does not have all that much lounging space."

Variants
Grampian 26
This model was introduced in 1967, with a fin keel. The boat has a PHRF racing average handicap of 228 with a high of 238 and low of 219.
Grampian 26 CB
This model was also introduced in 1967 and features a centreboard, but only a few were built. The boat has a PHRF racing average handicap of 225 with a high of 219 and low of 231.

See also

List of sailing boat types

Similar sailboats
Beneteau First 26
Beneteau First 265
C&C 26
C&C 26 Wave
Contessa 26
Dawson 26
Discovery 7.9
Herreshoff H-26
Hunter 26
Hunter 26.5
Hunter 260
Hunter 270
MacGregor 26
Mirage 26
Nash 26
Nonsuch 26
Outlaw 26
Paceship PY 26
Parker Dawson 26
Pearson 26
Sandstream 26
Tanzer 26
Yamaha 26

References

External links

Video: Grampian 26 CB sailing

Keelboats
1960s sailboat type designs
Sailing yachts
Sailboat type designs by Alex McGruer
Sailboat types built by Grampian Marine